Mariya Dzhumabaevna Pinigina (née Kulchunova; born 9 February 1958 in Ivanovka, Kyrgyz SSR) is a former Olympic athlete who competed mainly in the 400 metres, training at Spartak in Kyiv. She represented the Soviet Union.

Pinigina competed for USSR in the 1988 Summer Olympics held in Seoul, South Korea in the 4 x 400 metres where she won the gold medal with her team mates 400m hurdles silver medalist Tatyana Ledovskaya, 400m bronze medalist Olga Nazarova and olympic 400m champion Olga Bryzgina. That USSR relay team set a new world record of 3:15.17 minutes which is still unbeaten.

She also won a bronze medal at the 1983 World Championships in Athletics.

In November 2013, she served as one of the torch bearers in Yakutsk for the 2014 Winter Olympics torch relay.

Mariya Pinigina is married to Olympic wrestling champion Pavel Pinigin.

References

External links
 
 
 

1958 births
Living people
People from Chüy Region
Kyrgyzstani female sprinters
Soviet female sprinters
Spartak athletes
World Athletics record holders (relay)
Athletes (track and field) at the 1988 Summer Olympics
Olympic athletes of the Soviet Union
Olympic gold medalists for the Soviet Union
World Athletics Championships medalists
European Athletics Championships medalists
World Athletics Championships athletes for the Soviet Union
Medalists at the 1988 Summer Olympics
Olympic gold medalists in athletics (track and field)
Universiade medalists in athletics (track and field)
Goodwill Games medalists in athletics
Universiade gold medalists for the Soviet Union
Medalists at the 1979 Summer Universiade
Medalists at the 1983 Summer Universiade
Competitors at the 1986 Goodwill Games
Olympic female sprinters
Friendship Games medalists in athletics